The following are the oldest private schools in the United States that are still in operation. The list does not include schools that have closed or consolidated with another school to form a new institution. The list is ordered by date of creation, and currently includes schools founded before 1800.

See also
 List of oldest schools
 List of the oldest public high schools in the United States

References

Oldest